USS LST-43 was a United States Navy  used exclusively in the Asiatic-Pacific Theater during World War II. Like many of her class, she was not named and is properly referred to by her hull designation.

Construction
LST-43 was laid down on 19 June 1943, at Pittsburgh, Pennsylvania, by the Dravo Corporation; launched on 28 August 1943; sponsored by Mrs. C. A. Hill; and commissioned on 6 October 1943.

Service history
During World War II, LST-43 was assigned to the Asiatic-Pacific theater. She took part in the Occupation of Kwajalein and Majuro Atolls from 31 January to 8 February 1944.

She was destroyed and sunk during the West Loch disaster alongside 5 other LSTs at Pearl Harbor, on 21 May 1944.

LST-43 was struck from the Navy Register on 18 July 1944.

In 1945, she was raised but deemed too expensive to be repaired thus she was towed out to sea and sunk again as a target ship for torpedoes.

Awards 
LST-43 have earned the following awards:

American Campaign Medal
Asiatic-Pacific Campaign Medal (1 battle star)
World War II Victory Medal

References

Bibliography

Further reading 
 
 
 
 

 

World War II amphibious warfare vessels of the United States
Ships built in Pittsburgh
1943 ships
LST-1-class tank landing ships of the United States Navy
Ships built by Dravo Corporation
Ships sunk as targets
Maritime incidents in May 1944